Vail Ski Resort is a ski resort in the western United States, located near the town of Vail in Eagle County, Colorado. At , it is the third-largest single-mountain ski resort in the U.S., behind Big Sky and Park City, featuring seven bowls and intermediate gladed terrain in Blue Sky Basin.

Opened in late 1962, Vail is one of 37 mountain resorts owned and operated by Vail Resorts, which also operates three other nearby ski resorts (Beaver Creek, Breckenridge, and Keystone).

Vail Mountain has three sections: The Front-Side, Blue Sky Basin, and the Back Bowls. Most of the resort is wide open terrain with all types of trails. There are cruising runs accessible from most front side and Blue Sky Basin lifts, as well as the wide open Back Bowls, glades, and chutes.

Vail has the fourth-largest area of skiable terrain in North America after Whistler Blackcomb, Park City Mountain Resort, and Big Sky.

Vail Village is modeled on Bavarian village styles, with pedestrian streets. Unlike other Colorado ski towns such as Aspen, Breckenridge, or Steamboat Springs, which existed as 19th century mining towns prior to the establishment of their ski resorts, the Vail village was built when the resort opened.

History

1960s
Vail Ski Resort was founded  in 1962 by Earl Eaton, Pete Seibert, Harley Higbie, and others. It is at the base of Vail Pass, named after Charles Vail, designer of the highway that passed through the valley.

During the training, Seibert and Eaton became familiar with the surrounding terrain, areas of which would become resorts in later decades. They discovered a peak that they believed to be well-located and with good snow, calling it No-name Mountain, which later became Vail.

Construction of the resort began in the then-uninhabited valley in 1962, and it opened six months later on December 15. There were originally three lifts, including one gondola that ran from Vail Village to Mid-Vail on the line where Gondola One operates. Several double chairlifts were later built: Golden Peak, which ran from Golden Peak base area up to the Riva Bahn Express midstation; Giant Steps, which ran from Vail Village to the bottom of the Avanti Express lift; the Avanti double chairlift; and two double chairlifts out of Mid-Vail, the Mountaintop and Hunky Dory lifts. A double chairlift, High Noon, serviced the Sun Down and Sun Up Bowls on the backside of the ridge. As Vail grew, a village formed at the base near the gondola, which was taken down in the 1970s and replaced with a Lift Engineering double chairlift.

1970s
By the early 1970s, the construction of Interstate 70 from Vail to Denver was mostly completed, replacing US Route 6. The opening of the Eisenhower Tunnel in 1973 (north bore, now westbound) provided easier access from Denver to ski resorts like Copper Mountain, Breckenridge, and Vail. Also in the mid-1970s, President Gerald Ford and family continued to vacation at their Vail home, bringing it international exposure. Later, Vail Village was expanded. In May 1970, Denver was awarded the 1976 Winter Olympics, with Vail later selected (in early 1972) to host the alpine competitions, moving from the original sites just east of Loveland Pass; Loveland Ski Area (slalom) and undeveloped Mount Sniktau (downhill, giant slalom). However, Colorado voters denied funding by a 3:2 ratio that November, and the games were relocated to Innsbruck in Austria, which had recently hosted in 1964.

By the mid-1970s, the mountain had been further expanded, with a second gondola added in the Lionshead area, which also included a residences and shops at the base of the slopes.

In 1976, a gondola cable snagged on a support tower on Friday, March 26, and two cabins derailed, killing four people and injuring eight. The gondola was closed for the remainder of the season, and trading in stock of the ski resort's parent company was temporarily suspended. Afterward, the original gondola in Vail Village was replaced with a double chairlift.

1980s
In 1985, Doppelmayr constructed four high-speed quads on the Front Side, making Vail the second mountain in the country to use them, after Breckenridge, and the first to install multiple quads. These lifts were the Game Creek Express (#7), Mountaintop Express (#4), Northwoods Express (#11), and Vista Bahn Express (#16). The Vista Bahn Express replaced the double chairlifts out of Vail Village, bringing skiers from Vail Village to Mid-Vail. The Mountaintop Express lift replaced a Lift Engineering triple chairlift running from Mid-Vail to Patrol Headquarters, while the Northwoods Express and Game Creek Express lifts replaced Riblet double chairlifts.

As part of Vail's 25th anniversary in 1988, Doppelmayr constructed two more high-speed quads. On the front side, the Born Free Express (#8) replaced a Lift Engineering double chairlift out of Lionshead. In the Back Bowls, the Orient Express lift (#21) opened the China, Teacup, and Siberia Bowls. A year later, another high-speed quad, the Avanti Express (#2), was built to replace another Lift Engineering double chairlift.

Vail hosted the Alpine World Championships in 1989 and co-hosted with nearby Beaver Creek in 1999.

1990s
In 1992, Vail purchased a Doppelmayr triple chairlift from Beaver Creek  the former Upper Horseshoe lift  and installed it in Sun Up Bowl as the Sun Up (#17) lift.

In 1993, Vail changed primary lift manufacturers, from Doppelmayr to Garaventa-CTEC, who installed three high-speed quads. The first was the Pride Express (#26) lift in 1993, which serviced the upper part of the runs on the west Front Side, and combined with the Born Free Express lift, supplemented the Eagle Bahn Gondola as a way to get to Eagle's Nest. In 1995, the Wildwood Express lift (#3) was built at Mid-Vail to replace Hunky Dory, a Lift Engineering fixed-grip quad. The lift reused the tower foundations of the original lift. In 1996, the Riva Bahn Express lift (#6) was built out of Golden Peak, improving access from Golden Peak to the rest of the mountain. That same year, the Eagle Bahn Gondola (#19) replaced the original Lionshead Gondola.

Vail Associates bought Vail, Breckenridge, Keystone, and Heavenly in California in 1996. The company allowed skiers to buy an all-mountain pass that granted admission to all of their resorts.

In the late 1990s, Vail decided to carry out a terrain expansion known as Category III, later renamed Blue Sky Basin. Despite widespread opposition from environmental groups over the potential that Blue Sky Basin would destroy lynx habitat, Vail received approval from the U.S. Forest Service to expand into Blue Sky Basin in 1999. In protest of the expansion, the Earth Liberation Front set fire to Two Elk Lodge, Camp One, Patrol Headquarters, and four chairlifts in October 1998, causing  in damage. Most of the lifts suffered only minor damage. However, the drive station for the High Noon lift was destroyed, and later rebuilt. Two Elk Lodge was a total loss, and with no time to rebuild it, Vail replaced it for the 1998–1999 ski season with a temporary aluminum structure named "One Elk". A new Two Elk Lodge and Patrol Headquarters were built the following year.

In 1999, Blue Sky Basin, an intermediate-expert back-country area with moguls, tree skiing, cliffs, glades, and ridges, directly across a creek from the Orient Express lift, opened. The expansion was serviced with three new Poma high-speed quads: the Teacup Express (#36), the Skyline Express (#37), and the Earl's Express (#38). The Teacup Express improved access to the Teacup Bowl trails, which beforehand had required riding the Orient Express lift and then traversing along a ridge and past Two Elk Lodge via a pair of rope tows. The new lifts opened in February 2000. The following winter, a fourth high-speed quad, Pete's Express (#39), was opened, and an additional four trails on the east side of the Basin were added.

The 1999 Alpine World Ski Championships were held in Vail/Beaver Creek.

2000s
In 2004, the original Lionshead skier bridge was replaced with a newer, wider bridge.

In 2006, Vail began offsetting all of its power usage by purchasing wind power credits. They were the second-largest corporation in the United States to do so.

In summer 2007, after seven years without a new chairlift, Vail undertook a lift-upgrade project on the East Front Side, as Leitner-Poma built two new high-speed quads. The lower of the two lifts, the Highline Express (#10), replaced a Riblet double chairlift that had been in operation since 1973. This lift reduced the ride up the Highline Trail from fifteen minutes to eight minutes. It services several long mogul runs on the east part of the Front Side, and is also one of the less-crowded sections of the mountain due to its remote location. Above the Highline Express, the Sourdough Express lift (#14) replaced a triple chairlift. It services a small pod of beginner trails, but is also used by regular skier traffic to move from Patrol Headquarters to the China Bowl and Blue Sky Basin. The new lift follows a slightly different alignment so as to eliminate a traverse from the original lift to Two Elk Lodge. The West Wall rope tow, which ran along the ridge between Two Elk Lodge and the top of the Teacup Express and Sun Up lifts was removed, redirecting ski traffic down the Whiskey Jack trail to the Sourdough Express. The original Sourdough triple chairlift was relocated to Eagle's Nest and reinstalled as the Little Eagle (#15) lift, replacing a Lift Engineering double chairlift.

Around this time, Vail removed two of its older double chairlifts. Giant Steps, which had transported skiers out of Vail Village since 1962, was removed in 2006. In 2008, Minnie's, which serviced learning terrain below Eagle's Nest, was also removed. Minnie's had previously been used in conjunction with the Born Free Express to provide access to Eagle's Nest. Still, it was shortened in 1994 after the construction of the Pride Express, and operated in shortened form until its removal.

A new plaza was opened at Vail Village in 2008. On February 27, 2010, one of the original black diamond trails into Vail Village, International, was renamed Lindsey's to honor Vail's Olympic gold medalist Lindsey Vonn. The trail is next to Giant Steps and one of two flanking the defunct Giant Steps lift line.

2010s
In 2010, Leitner-Poma constructed another high-speed quad in the Back Bowls. The High Noon Express (#5) replaced a Doppelmayr triple chairlift that had been in use since 1979 and was the resort's 17th high-speed quad to be built. The new quad increased capacity to the Sun Down and Sun Up Bowls, and reduced lengthy lines that the lift often received, especially on powder days. With the construction of the High Noon Express lift, all of Vail's terrain  with the exception of the eastern edge of the Mongolia Bowl (only accessible by platter)  was accessible from high-speed quads. The High Noon Express lift was also meant to alleviate lines at the Northwoods Express lift by providing an alternative route for advanced and expert skiers finishing their time in Blue Sky Basin and the China Bowl to return to the Front Side.

In 2011, Vail opened a new ski-in/out fine dining restaurant at mid-Vail. The Tenth, built between the Wildwood Express and the Mid-Vail facility, is named for the famed US Army division that trained nearby and several Vail founders once belonged.

By 2012, Vail's original high-speed quads from Doppelmayr were beginning to show their age and were due to be upgraded. The first to go would be the Vista Bahn Express, which as part of Vail's 50th anniversary celebration was replaced by a Leitner-Poma ten person gondola. Gondola One (#1) provides a fast, warm and sheltered ride between Vail Village and the Mid-Vail area. The construction of Gondola One saw the return of a gondola to the line that had contained Vail's original gondola until 1976, then contained a double chairlift on the lower section until 1985, and then the Vista Bahn Express from 1985 to 2012.

For the 2013–14 season, Doppelmayr built two new chairlifts. At Golden Peak base area, the resort's last remaining double chairlift, Gopher Hill (#12), was replaced with a recycled Doppelmayr triple chairlift purchased from Beaver Creek. The upgrade to Gopher Hill increased uphill capacity for the ski and ride school, especially for three- to six-year-old skiers and riders who must ride the lift with an adult. The bottom terminal was slightly moved from the original location. More significantly, Vail received their first high-speed six pack with the replacement of the Mountaintop Express (#4) lift. It was the first new Doppelmayr detachable chairlift to be built at Vail since the Avanti Express lift in 1989. It increased uphill capacity on the lift line by 33% from 2,800 people per hour to 3,600 people per hour, matching the uphill capacity of Gondola One. The new lift follows a slightly different alignment from the old lift, with the bottom terminal being moved 90 feet east of its original location to decrease cross-traffic in the area. The Mountaintop Express was the first detachable chairlift in the western United States to use a conveyor belt at the loading area, a system that is widely used at European ski resorts, shown to cut down on stops and slows, shortening the ride time (several more six packs built at Vail Resorts properties around the same time would include a loading carpet, including the Colorado SuperChair at Breckenridge in 2014, the King Con Express at Park City Mountain Resort in 2015, and Vail's own Avanti Express lift).

For the 2015–16 season, Doppelmayr built a second high-speed six pack to replace the Avanti Express (#2) lift. Just like the Mountaintop Express lift built two years before it, the Avanti Express lift was built with a loading carpet. Unlike its older sister, the Avanti Express reuses the towers from its predecessor. The fun park at Eagle's Nest was also expanded with the addition of a new zipline canopy tour in Game Creek Bowl, and the construction of an alpine coaster to the west of the Pride Express lift.

For the 2016–17 season, the Sun Up lift was replaced with a high–speed quad by Leitner-Poma. The lift was also renumbered as lift No. 9, instead of lift No. 17, as Vail sought to plug numbering gaps in their lift system. With the installation of the Sun Up Express (#9) lift, all major uphill lifts on the mountain are high–speed detachables, and the only fixed grip lifts are Cascade Village, Gopher Hill and Little Eagle.

For the 2017–18 season, Vail built their third high speed six pack when it contracted Leitner-Poma to upgrade the Northwoods Express (#11) lift, which at that point was the remaining lift servicing Patrol Headquarters that had not yet been upgraded. The upgrade to the Northwoods Express improved uphill capacity from 2,800 pph to 3,000 pph on the east Front Side, especially in the afternoon when skier traffic is using the lift to return from Blue Sky Basin and the China Bowl to the Front Side.

2020s
To mark Vail's 60th anniversary, the 2022-2023 season saw Leitner-Poma construct two new high speed chairlifts. These new lifts included a high speed six pack to replace the Game Creek Express (#7), and a new high speed quad known as the Sun Down Express (#17) to provide direct lift service to the Sun Down Bowl.

Vail has been the number one ski resort in the United States fourteen times in a 17-year period.

White River National Forest
Vail Resorts operates on National Forest System lands under special use permit to the White River National Forest. Master Development Plans, Winter and Summer Operations Plans, Construction Plans, and every phase of the permit holder's skiing operation is approved by the federal government annually prior to construction and operation. In exchange for the use of National Forest system lands the resort pays an annual fee to the U.S. Treasury amounting to about one dollar per skier visit. Twenty-five percent of the fees collected are returned to Eagle County for roads and schools, in lieu of taxes. The federal government supports the objective of providing healthy recreation opportunities in quality natural outdoor environments. Millions of national and international users during all seasons of the year appreciate the opportunities provided by Vail Resorts and White River National Forest through the public and private partnership on federal lands.

Reference: Code of Federal Regulations, Title 36: Parks, Forests, and Public Property, Part 251—Land Uses, § 251.51 Definitions. Ski area —a site and attendant facilities expressly developed to accommodate alpine or Nordic skiing and from which the preponderance of revenue is generated by the sale of lift tickets and fees for ski rentals, for skiing instruction and trail passes for the use of permittee-maintained ski trails. A ski area may also include ancillary facilities directly related to the operation and support of skiing activities.

Forest Service feasibility studies
In 1972 the White River National Forest analyzed the terrain surrounding Vail to determine ski area feasibility of the greater regional area and identify additional opportunities for public parking and access to National Forest lands between Vail Pass and Lake Creek above Edwards. The investigation was stimulated by the planned construction of Interstate 70 over Vail Pass, or alternative Red Buffalo Corridor, and the awarding of the 1976 Winter Olympics to Denver by the International Olympic Committee in 1970 with the showcase downhill event later planned for the yet undeveloped Beaver Creek ski area. New parking areas on Shrine Pass, Battle Mountain, Meadow Mountain, Minturn, Stone Creek, Avon, and Lake Creek were identified as development sites, base areas, and potential new skier entrance portals. Integration of Vail Ski Resort, including Blue Sky Basin, with skiing terrain on Battle Mountain, Grouse Mountain, Meadow Mountain, Stone Creek, Beaver Creek, and Lake Creek were analyzed and considered physically feasible as an integrated mega-resort with multiple portals. Twenty-eight ski lifts were planned for Grouse Mountain above Minturn, which was rated comparable to Snowmass in overall size and capacity with significant amount of terrain in the intermediate category with good snowfall.

Findings were presented to William Lucas, Rocky Mountain Regional Forester, by Thomas Evans, Forest Supervisor, and Erik J. Martin, professional landscape architect, lead member of the Blue Ribbon study committee for ski area planning feasibility, and program manager for ski area administration. Grouse Mountain above Minturn was highly rated for developed alpine skiing and conceived by White River National Forest skiing experts as a potential future phase of a large mega-skiing complex on National Forest System lands linking the existing Vail ski area and Battle Mountain east of Minturn with Grouse Mountain, Beaver Creek, Meadow Mountain ski area, Bachelor Gulch, and Arrowhead on the west side. Development of Grouse Mountain did not occur due to the high cost of development, rejection of the '76 Winter Olympic Games, vocal public opposition at the local and statewide levels, and a desire by Vail Resorts to fully develop Beaver Creek and Vail Mountain prior to expansion. The opportunity to provide developed alpine skiing on Grouse Mountain was eliminated from future consideration with the establishment of the Holy Cross Wilderness in 1980.

Forest plans
The 2002 Revision of the 1984 Land and Resource Management Plan Forest plans, White River National Forest, Chapter 3-Management Area Direction, 8.25 Ski areas – Existing and Potential, pages 3–80 through 3–8, and 8.31 Aerial Transportation Corridors, page 3-84, establishes long-term planning direction for Vail Ski Resort. Lift access from remote areas and new portals, including Minturn, were analyzed in the plan. The theme of an 8.31 aerial transportation corridor designation is to serve the principal purpose of transporting people to, from, and within communities, and ski areas. The theme of an 8.25 land allocation is to allow ski areas on federal lands to be developed and operated by the private sector to provide opportunities for intensively managed outdoor recreation activities during all seasons of the year. The 8.25 management area prescription includes existing developed ski areas and undeveloped expansion areas with potential for future development.

Ski areas provide winter sports activities and other intensively managed outdoor recreation opportunities for large numbers of national and international visitors in highly developed settings. In some areas, use in the summer may be as intensive as in the winter. The White River National Forest forest plan addresses vegetation management, intensity of use, seasons of use, and motorized access. The 8.25 management area includes existing resorts that have already been permitted and developed, as well as additional suitable terrain into which development is planned for the future. The 1984 Forest Plan and 2002 revision were authored by Erik J. Martin, Program Manager for Ski Area Administration, to identify future expansion opportunities and alternative special-use permit boundaries for Vail ski area. The 1984 Land and Resource Management Plan [Forest plan] was revised in 2002, and analyzed in a Final Environmental Impact Statement. A summary of the Final Environmental Impact Statement to accompany the Land and Resource Management Plan – 2002 Revision is available to the public at local Forest Service Offices, public library, or National Forest web site.

Topography and configuration

Elevation
Summit: 
Base:
Vertical:

Slope aspects
North: 40% of skiable terrain.
South: 20%
East:20%
West:20%

Trails
Skiable area: 
Trails: 193 total (18% beginner, 29% intermediate, 53% advanced/expert)
Longest run: Riva Ridge – 
Average annual snowfall: 
terrain parks: 3
1 Superpipe
Bowls: 10 (7 official)
Sun Down Bowl
Sun Up Bowl
China Bowl
Siberia Bowl
Tea Cup Bowl
Inner Mongolia Bowl
Outer Mongolia Bowl
Pete's Bowl
Earl's Bowl
Game Creek Bowl

Lifts

References

Further reading

External links

Vail Resorts corporate site

Buildings and structures in Eagle County, Colorado
Ski areas and resorts in Colorado
Vail Resorts
Tourist attractions in Eagle County, Colorado
White River National Forest
1962 establishments in Colorado